Jack Whitver (born September 4, 1980) is an American businessman and politician, who is currently the Iowa State Senator for the 23rd District. Since 2018 he has served as Senate Majority Leader. Whitver played college football for Iowa State University, starting at wide receiver.

Career 

Whitver founded Acceleration Iowa in 2004 with business partner Geoff Jensen. They added new locations in 2007 and 2009. Acceleration Iowa is a sports training business, which develops speed, quickness and overall athletic ability for young athletes. In 2012, Whitver bought CrossFit Des Moines and CrossFit Waukee and opened North Ankeny CrossFit. Whitver was an assistant coach (wide receivers and offensive coordinator) for the Iowa Barnstormers of the Arena Football League from 2008 to 2011. Whitver is also an attorney with the Des Moines law firm Whitaker Hagenow & Gustoff.

Whitver was elected to the Iowa State Senate from District 35 on January 18, 2011, in a special election. District 35 covered Ankeny, Johnston, Grimes, Polk City and the entire northern part of Polk County. He defeated John Calhoun by a margin of 63%-37%. After the redistricting of 2012, Whitver represented District 19 in the State Senate, which covered Ankeny, Alleman, Saylor Township, and a small part of Des Moines. After redistricting in 2022, Whitver currently represents District 23.

Whitver was sworn into the Iowa Senate on January 24, 2011, and was named to the Judiciary, Economic Growth and Human Resource committees.  In 2013 Whitver was named Ranking Member of the Appropriations Committee as well as serving on the Economic Growth, Ethics, Human Resource, Judiciary and State Government committees.

References 

1980 births
Living people
21st-century American politicians
American football wide receivers
Drake University Law School alumni
Iowa State Cyclones football players
Republican Party Iowa state senators
People from Ankeny, Iowa
People from Knoxville, Iowa
People from Poweshiek County, Iowa
Presidents of the Iowa Senate